John Stone was an English politician who sat in the House of Commons between 1653 and 1659.

Stone was from Ridgmont, Bedfordshire and lived at Friday Street, London. In 1632 he purchased the manor of Chalford in Aston Rowant in Oxfordshire.

In 1653, Stone was elected Member of Parliament for City of London in the Barebones Parliament.  He was a trustee for the Lord Mayor and commonalty of London in 1653. In 1654 he was elected MP for  Cirencester in the First Protectorate Parliament. He was one of the three Tellers of the Exchequer in 1654. In 1655 he was a member of the Trade Committee and the Trade and Navigation Committee, an auditor of all treasurers and receivers of state money, an excise commissioner and agent for wine licences. He was re-elected MP for Cirencester in 1656 for the Second Protectorate Parliament and became a commissioner for securing the peace in the City of London in the same year. In 1659 he was re-elected MP for Cirencester  for the Third Protectorate Parliament.

Stone had a son Richard who died in 1661 and was the father of John Stone MP for Wallingford.

References

Year of birth missing
Year of death missing
Members of the Parliament of England for the City of London
People from Central Bedfordshire District
English MPs 1653 (Barebones)
English MPs 1654–1655
English MPs 1656–1658
English MPs 1659
Politicians from Gloucestershire